Safe Upon the Shore is the ninth and final studio album released by Canadian folk rock band Great Big Sea. The album was released on July 13, 2010.

Track listing

Tracks 2, 3, 4, 7, and the bonus tracks were road tested before they recorded it in the studio.

Reception

Commercial performance
The album debuted at No. 2 on the Canadian Albums Chart, falling short to Eminem's Recovery. The album sold 7,000 copies in its first week, while Eminem placed first with 30,000 copies.

Critical reception
Greg Prato of allmusic gave the album mainly positive reviews, saying "there is more than meets the eye (or more fittingly, the ear) to this Canadian outfit. Great Big Sea has created a pure "heartland sound" all its own."

Personnel
 Alan Doyle – Vocals, Guitars, Bouzouki, Mandolin, Banjo, Piano
 Bob Hallett – Vocals, Accordion, Concertina, Whistle, Harmonica, Bouzouki, Mandolin, Fiddle, Banjo, Pipes
 Séan McCann – Vocals, Guitar, Bodhran, Percussion

With
Murray Foster - Vocals, Bass, Guitar
Kris MacFarlane - Vocals, Drums, Percussion, Guitar, Keyboards, Piano Accordion

Guest Musicians
Sonny Landreth - Slide Guitar
Jeen O'Brien - Vocals
Steve Berlin - Keyboards, Melodica, Percussion
Washboard Hank - Washboard
Mark Mullins - Trombone, Arrangements
Craig Klein - Trombone
Greg Hicks - Trombone
J.P. Cormier - Mandolin, Guitar, Banjo, Fiddle
Shannon Powell - Tambourine
Jeremy Fisher - Guitar

Charts

Chart positions

Sales

References

2010 albums
Great Big Sea albums
Warner Music Group albums